The following radio stations broadcast on AM frequency 1140 kHz: 1140 AM is a Mexican and United States clear-channel frequency. XEMR Monterrey, Mexico, and WRVA Richmond, Virginia, share Class A status of 1140 AM.

In Argentina 
 La Luna in El Palomar, Buenos Aires
 LU22 in Tandil, Buenos Aires

In Canada

In Mexico 
Stations in bold are clear-channel stations.
  in Apodaca, Nuevo León - 50 kW, transmitter located at 
 XEPEC-AM in San Bartolo Tutotepec, Hidalgo
  in Tecpatan, Chiapas

In the United States 
Stations in bold are clear-channel stations.

References

Lists of radio stations by frequency